Hub Nunatak is a beehive-shaped nunatak in the lower part of Lammers Glacier on the Antarctic Peninsula. The feature is conspicuously located near the center of the Traffic Circle, a glacial depression which is notable for the series of prominent glaciers which flow toward, or emanate from it in a radial pattern. The nunatak was discovered in 1940 by members of the East Base party of the U.S. Antarctic Service, 1939–41, who so named the nunatak because of its unique location in the Traffic Circle.

References

Nunataks of Graham Land
Bowman Coast
Fallières Coast